Roman Sergeevich Madyanov (born July 22, 1962) is a Soviet and Russian actor. Madyanov's career in cinema began as a child actor when he starred as Huckleberry Finn in Hopelessly Lost (1973). He is best known in the West for portraying the corrupt mayor Vadim in the 2014 film Leviathan.

Biography
Madyanov was born in the city of Dedovsk, Istrinsky District, Moscow Oblast. His father, Sergei Veniaminovich Madyanov, worked as a television editor, and mother Antonina Mikhailovna as a librarian.

Roman Madyanov's father worked as a director on television and often took Roman and his elder brother Vadim to work. There he was noticed by assistants of directors which led him to have his cinematic debut in 1971 in an episodic role in the film "Translation from English".

In 1973, starred in the leading role of Huckleberry Finn in the picture by Georgiy Daneliya Hopelessly Lost. In his school years Roman Madyanov also starred in the films "Aniskin and Fantomas", "Spring Turners" and "Everything is Brother's Fault".

Madyanov graduated from the Russian Academy of Theatre Arts (course O. Remez), playing in the theatrical performance of director Kama Ginkas. As a student he began to play at the Moscow Mayakovsky Theater. He was drafted in the army and served in the forces of rocket and space defense. After serving in the army in 1987 he returned to the theater. In the state of the theater Madyanov was about twenty years old, having played about thirty roles.

In 1989, Madyanov appeared in the Leonid Gaidai film Private Detective, or Operation Cooperation.

He also took part in the filming of the Yeralash magazine, a number of commercials.

In 1995, Roman Madyanov was awarded the title of "Honored Artist of the Russian Federation".

Selected filmography 
Roman Madyanov has starred in over 145 films

 1973 — Hopelessly Lost as Huckleberry Finn
 1989 — Private Detective, or Operation Cooperation (Частный детектив или операция "Кооперация") as Victor
 2005 — The Case of Dead Souls (Дело о Мёртвых душах) as Ivan Shpekin
 2005 — Yesenin (Есенин) as Sergey Kirov
 2006 — The First Circle (В круге первом) as Viktor Abakumov
 2007 — 12 (Двенадцать) as 12th Juror
 2007 — The Irony of Fate 2 (Ирония Судьбы. Продолжение) as police officer
 2009 — Wild Field (Дикое поле) as Ryabov
 2009 — Pete on the Way to Heaven (Петя по дороге в Царствие Небесное) as Colonel Boguslavsky
 2009 — High Security Vacation (Каникулы строгого режима) as Klyk
 2010 — Our Russia. The Balls of Fate (Наша Russia. Яйца судьбы) as Oleg Robertovich
 2011 — Yolki 2 (Ёлки 2) as employee of the State Traffic Safety Inspectorate
 2011 — All Inclusive (All inclusive, или Всё включено!) as Eduard Budko
 2012 — Once Upon a Time There Lived a Simple Woman (Жила-была одна баба) as Baranchik
 2013 — Legend № 17 (Легенда №17) as Vladimir Alfer
 2014 — Leviathan (Левиафан) as mayor
 2015 — Catherine the Great (Великая) as Alexander Shuvalov
 2016 — The Groom (Жених) as general
 2016 — The Monk and the Demon (Монах и бес) as bishop
 2017 — The Road to Calvary (Хождение по мукам) as Olovyannikov

Awards and nominations

References

External links
 
  (in Russian)

1962 births
Living people
People from Dedovsk
Soviet male child actors
Russian male child actors
20th-century Russian male actors
21st-century Russian male actors
Soviet male film actors
Russian male film actors
Russian male television actors
Russian male stage actors
Honored Artists of the Russian Federation
Russian Academy of Theatre Arts alumni
Recipients of the Nika Award